The Oceanside Generals are a junior "B" ice hockey team based in Parksville, British Columbia, Canada. They are members of the North Division of the Vancouver Island Junior Hockey League (VIJHL). The team operates as a not for profit society, run by a hockey passionate board of directors. The Generals play their home games at Oceanside Place. Dan Lemmon is the team's Head Coach.

History

The Generals joined the league in 1990 as an expansion team. In its VIJHL history, the team has won the Brent Patterson Memorial Trophy three times, in 1992, 1997 and 2009. The Generals have won the Andy Hebenton Trophy twice, as the team with the league's best regular season record in 1991 and 1992.

Season-by-season record

Note: GP = Games played, W = Wins, L = Losses, T = Ties, OTL = Overtime Losses, Pts = Points, GF = Goals for, GA = Goals against

Cyclone Taylor Cup
British Columbia Jr B Provincial Championships

NHL alumni
Kris Mallette

Awards and trophies
Brent Patterson Memorial TrophyVIJHL Championship
1991-92, 1996–97, 2008–09

Andy Hebenton TrophyRegular Season Champion
1990-91, 1991–92

Grant Peart Memorial TrophyLeast Penalized Team
2003-04

Doug Morton TrophyLeading Scorer
James Startup: 1989-90
Paul Scorer: 1990-91
Paul Scorer: 1991-92Jamie Robertson TrophyMost Sportsmanlike Player
Steve Moore: 1993-94
Joel Corlazzoli: 1999-00
Ian Hall: 2006-07
Taylor Morgan: 2007-08
Brent Baltus: 2009-10
Michael Fretz: 2012-13
Ray's Sports Centre TrophyTop Goaltender
Cesare Marcellus: 1989-90
Cesare Marcellus: 1990-91
Cesare Marcellus: 1991-92
Brodie Opheim: 1994-95

Walt McWilliams Memorial TrophyUnsung Hero
Ian McCann: 1991-92
Kevin Barabash: 1997-98
Derek Brown: 2003-04
Kyle Yamasaki: 2011-12

External links
Official website of the Oceanside Generals

Ice hockey teams in British Columbia
Parksville, British Columbia
1990 establishments in British Columbia
Ice hockey clubs established in 1990